Nora Baker may refer to:

 Noor Inayat Khan (1914–1944), British spy who used the alias Nora Baker
 Character played by Susan Sarandon in the film White Palace